Akhmeta (Axmeṫis municiṗaliṫeṫi) is the administrative – territorial unit in Eastern Georgia, in the region of Kakheti. The administrative center of Akhmeta municipality is the town Akhmeta.

The Municipality borders Dusheti Municipality and Tianeti Municipality to the west, Chechnya to the north, Telavi Municipality and Dagestan to the east, and Sagarejo Municipality to the south.

Akhmeta Municipality includes the historic region of Tusheti. 
The area of the municipality covers 2207.6 km2.

History
Until 1930, the current territory of Akhmeta Municipality was a part of Tianeti Mazra, from 1930 it moved to Telavi Mazra, from 1951 it was separated into a distinct area, in 1963–1964 it was returned to Telavi district. From August 1964, it was re-established as a separate district within the present borders. Akhmeta was declared a Town in 1966.  Since 2006 – municipality.

Administrative divisions and population

Akhmeta Municipality consists of 15 administrative units and 108 settlements. According to the National Statistics Office of Georgia, the population of Akhmeta Municipality as of January 1, 2021, is 28.9 thousand people. 6.4 thousand people live in urban areas and 22.5 thousand people in rural areas.

According to the 2014 census data the population of Akhmeta District was 31,461. 78.99% of them was Georgians, 17.39% Kists, 2.21% Ossetians, 0.41% Chechens.
 The administrative unit of the town Akhmeta – town Akhmeta, and villages: Bughani, Kvemo Chopchauri;
 The administrative unit of Matani – the village Matani
 The administrative unit of Sakobiano –  villages: Bakilovani, Dedisperuli, Kutsakhta, Sakobiano, Koreti, Kvareltskali, Khevischala;
 The administrative unit of Duisi –  villages: Duisi, Tsinubani;
 The administrative unit of Jokolo –  villages: Birkiani, Dzibakhevi, Jokolo;
 The administrative unit of Khalatsani –  villages: Dumasturi, Omalo; Zemo Khalatsani, Kvemo Khalatsani, Shua Khalatsani;
 The administrative unit of Zemo Alvani –  villages: Zemo Alvani, Khorbalo;
 The administrative unit of Kvemo Alvani –  villages: Babaneuri, Kvemo Alvani;
 The administrative unit of Maghraani –  villages: Argokhi, Maghraani, Pichkhovani;
 The administrative unit of Ozhio –  villages: , Koghoto, Ozhio;
 The administrative unit of Zemo Khodasheni –  villages: Atskuri, Akhaldaba, Zemo Khodasheni, Chabinani, Chareqauli, Khveliandro, Khorkheli;
 The administrative unit of Qistauri –  villages: Arashenda, Akhalsheni, Akhshani, The fields of Akhasheni, Ingeti, Kojori, Osiauri, Sachale, Qistauri;
 The administrative unit of Kasristskali –  the village Kasristskali;
 The administrative unit of Shakhvetila- villages:   Bukhrebi, Vvedzebi, Naduqnari, Sabue, Shakhvetila, Chachkhriala, Tchartala, Jaburi;
 The administrative unit of Tusheti –  villages: Ageurta, Alisgori, Baso, Beghela, Biquurta, Botchorna, Bukhurta, Girevi, Gogrulta, Gudanta, Dadikurta, Dartlo, Daqiurta, Diklo, Dotchu, Etelta, Iliurta, Ipkhori, Vakisdziri, Verkhovani, Vestmo, Vestomta, Vedziskhevi, Tushetis Sabue, Indurta, Intsukhi, Kvavlo, Koklata, Natsikhari, Omalo, Ortsikhe, Zhvelurta, Sagirta, Sachighlo, Tbatana, Parsma, Qumelaurta, Tsokalta, Shenaqo, Shtrolta, Chiglaurta, Chigho, Tsaro, Tchala, Tchero, Tchesho, Tchontio, Khakhabo, Khiso, Jvarboseli, Hegho.

Geography

The municipality is bordered on the west by Dusheti and Tianeti municipalities, on the north by Chechnya, on the east by Telavi Municipality and the Autonomous Republic of Dagestan, and on the south by Sagarejo Municipality.

The area of Akhmeta municipality is 2207.6 km2. Agricultural lands occupy 80,266 hectares, while 91,200 hectares of the municipality are covered with forests.

The lower zone of the territorial unit has a moderately humid climate, with hot summers and relatively cold winters. Annual precipitation is in the range of 770–820 mm. The moderately humid climate is formed in the area of 700–1200 m above sea level. The average annual rainfall is 1200–2000 mm. The average temperature in the coldest month of the year, January, is (-) 3 °C, and in  – July 22 °C. At 1200–2000 m above sea level, a humid climate is developed, with cold winters and cool summers; the average annual rainfall is around 1500–1700 mm.

The hydrological network is very frequent on the territory of the municipality. This administrative unit is characterized by the fast mountain rivers. The Pirikiti Alazani and Tushetis Alazani basins represent the rivers of the municipality.

Politics
Akhmeta Municipal Assembly (Georgian: ახმეტის საკრებულო) is a representative body in Akhmeta Municipality. currently consisting of 30 members. The council is assembles into session regularly, to consider subject matters such as code changes, utilities, taxes, city budget, oversight of city government and more. Akhmeta sakrebulo is elected every four year. The last election was held in October 2021.

Education
There are 24 public schools, 37 Nursery schools, and 1 College operate in the municipality. There are 1547 children enrolled in nursery schools.
Eight libraries are functioning in Akhmeta Municipality, where 133688 books are kept.  With the initiative of the National Library of Georgia, working on the creation of an electronic library is underway.

Culture
Three museums are operating in Akhmeta municipality (Rapiel Eristavi House Museum , Akhmeta Museum of Local Lore in the village of Kvemo Alvani and Pankisi Ethnographic Museum), Besik Mamiauri School of Art and Cognition, a union of music schools with branches in the villages of Matani, Duisi, Zemo Alvani and Kvemo Alvani and the Cultural Center, under which are 10 Rural Culture Houses.

Festivals and public holidays

Sports
There are three sports schools in Akhmeta Municipality – Akhmeta Football School "Bakhtrioni", Sports-Educational Institution of Akhmeta Sports School Complex, and Zurab Zviadauri Judo Sports School of Akhmeta.

The schools have judo, freestyle, Greco-Roman, arm wrestling, football, basketball, athletics, tennis, kickbox, rugby sections, which involve up to 700 children. Sports competitions and tournaments are held in Akhmeta Municipality throughout the year.

In Akhmeta municipality there is a Horse riding (equestrian) club within Akhmeta Complex Sports School. At the equestrian base, around 35–40 children are taking training.

Tourism

A Department of Tourism Development, Foreign Relations and International Projects operates under the Akhmeta Municipal Administration, which provides information to foreign and local tourists on tourism infrastructure, tourist sites, tourism programs, transport, natural monuments, protected areas, architectural and archaeological sites, cultural events, festivals, festivals, public holidays and other topics.
The following types of tourism are developed in Akhmeta Municipality:
 Hiking tourism; 
 Equestrian tourism;  
 Ecotourism;  
 Agrotourism.

Visitor Center of Akhmeta municipality, Tusheti
Tusheti is located across the main ridge of the Caucasus, on its northern slope. Tusheti is included in the tentative list of UNESCO World Heritage sites.

Economy
The local economy of Akhmeta Municipality is mainly represented by agriculture, processing industry, tourism, services, and trade. According to the data of the National Statistics Office of Georgia for May 1, 2019, 3626 registered enterprises are operating in the territory of Akhmeta Municipality, which are classified into 5 large, 30 medium, and 448 small enterprises.
There are 9 small family cellars in the municipality.

Most of all, 336 enterprises operate in the trade and services sector, up to 83 facilities provide hotel-type services in the municipality.

The agricultural sector is represented by 13 small enterprises, and 19 cooperatives. 34 small, 3 medium and 1 large enterprise operating in the field of industry are represented by wine factories, building materials, and wood processing industries as well as furniture enterprises.

Historical landmarks and sightseeing

Bakhtrioni fortress

Bakhtrioni Fortress – a feudal era fortress in Akhmeta municipality of Kakheti region. It is located near the town of Akhmeta, southeast of the village of Khorbalo, on the left bank of the Alazani River, near its confluence with the Ilto River. The fortress was built in the late 50s of the XVII century by the command of Shah Abbas II of Iran.

Kvetera

The historic fortress city of Kvetera is located on the right bank of the river Ilto, on the left side of the highway connecting Akhmeta-Tianeti, 12 km from Akhmeta. The castle-city complex includes inner castle, lower castle, fence, palace, hall church, and the main attraction – a domed church.

Alaverdi Monastery

Alaverdi Monastery was founded in the middle of the VI century by one of the Assyrian holy fathers, Joseph Alaverdi (Ioseb Alaverdeli). At the beginning of the XI century, Kvirike, the king of Kakheti, in the place of a small church of St. George, built a cathedral, which is known by the name of Alaverdi.

Matani Tskhrakara

The monastery complex is located in the west of the village of Matani, Akhmeta Municipality. According to the decree of the President of Georgia of November 7, 2006, the monastery complex was awarded the category of the immovable cultural monuments of National significance.

Tskhrakara Palace Complex
Remains of the palace complex of King Levan (1520–1574) are located between the villages of Zemo Alvani and Kvemo Alvani in Akhmeta Municipality, above the Alazani field, on the foothills of the Caucasus. Near it, the basilica of St. Ioane the Baptist is located, in which the severely damaged portraits of King Levan and Queen Tinatin have survived.

Notable people

Twin towns
Akhmeta Municipality is twinned with:

Bilhorod-Dnistrovskyi, Ukraine
Klaipėda, Lithuania
Panevėžys, Lithuania
Ialoveni District, Moldova

See also 
 List of municipalities in Georgia (country)

References

External links 
 Districts of Georgia, Statoids.com

Municipalities of Kakheti